Thomas Hope may refer to:

Politicians
Sir Thomas Hope of Kerse (1606–1643), Scottish judge and politician
Thomas Hope (American politician) (1784–1876), American politician
Thomas Hope (MP for Linlithgowshire) (1848–1925), UK MP for the Scottish constituency of Linlithgowshire
Thomas Hope (MP for Maidstone), British politician

Others
Sir Thomas Hope, 1st Baronet (1573–1646), Scottish lawyer
Thomas Hope (1704-1779) the Elder, Dutch banker
Sir Thomas Hope, 8th Baronet (1735–1771), Scottish aristocrat and agricultural reformer
Thomas Hope (architect) (1757–1820), English-born American architect
Thomas Charles Hope (1766–1844), Scottish physician and chemist
Thomas Hope (designer) (1769–1831), collector, grandson of the elder
Thomas Hope (pastor) (1846–1916), Congregationalist minister in South Australia
Thomas Frederick Hope (1919–1996), Sierra Leonean civil engineer, businessman, and scholar